Gekko porosus, also known as Taylor's gecko or the Batan narrow-disked gecko, is a species of gecko. It is found in the northern Philippines.

References

Gekko
Reptiles of the Philippines
Endemic fauna of the Philippines
Reptiles described in 1922
Taxa named by Edward Harrison Taylor